Manuel Yrigoyen Diez-Canseco (1873 in Lima, Peru – May 25, 1933 in Lima, Peru) was a Peruvian politician in the early 20th century. He was the mayor of Lima, from 1919 to 1920, congressman and president of the National Club.

He was son of the former prime minister Manuel Yrigoyen Arias and Mercedes Diez-Canseco Olazabal.

1873 births
1933 deaths
Mayors of Lima
Peruvian people of Basque descent
Peruvian people of Spanish descent